Key Stage 4 (KS4) is the legal term for the two years of school education which incorporate GCSEs, and other examinations, in maintained schools in England normally known as Year 10 and Year 11, when pupils are aged between 14 and 16 by August 31. (In some schools, KS4 work is started in Year 9.)

Legal definition
The term is defined in the Education Act 2002 as "the period beginning at the same time as the school year in which the majority of pupils in his class attain the age of fifteen and ending at the same time as the school year in which the majority of pupils in his class cease to be of compulsory school age".  Since that Act, the ending of compulsory education in England has been extended beyond the age of sixteen, but compulsory education beyond the age of 16 is not classed as part of Key Stage 4.

England and Wales

Purpose
The term is used to define the group of pupils who must follow the relevant programmes of study from the National Curriculum. All pupils in this Key Stage must follow a programme of education in the following areas:
English
Mathematics
Science
Information and Communication Technology (England only)
Physical Education
Citizenship
Careers Education
Religious Education
Work-related learning
Welsh (Wales only)

In addition, there is a statutory duty on schools to provide an optional programme of education for pupils in this Key Stage in each of the following areas:
The Arts
Design and Technology
The Humanities and Healthcare
Modern Foreign Languages

At the end of this stage, pupils aged 15 or 16 depending on  their  birthday - in Year 11 - are normally entered for a range of external examinations.  Most frequently, these are GCSE (General Certificate of Secondary Education) examinations, although a range of other qualifications is growing in popularity, including NVQ National Vocational Qualifications.  These examinations are set by one of the examination boards. Results of examinations at this age are published as part of the Department for Education Performance Tables.

Northern Ireland

Legal definition
The term is defined in The Education (Northern Ireland) Order 2006 as "the period beginning at the same time as the next school year after the end of key stage 3 and ending at the same time as he ceases to be of compulsory school age". Notably, the earlier Key Stages are defined as lasting for ten years in total from the start of compulsory education.

Purpose
The term is used to define the group of pupils who must follow the relevant programmes of study from the National Curriculum. All pupils in this Key Stage must follow a programme of education in the nine areas of learning in the curriculum, some of which include specific subject strands:

Language and Literacy
Mathematics and Numeracy
Modern Languages
The Arts
Environment and Society
Science and Technology
Learning for Life and Work
Employability
Local and Global Citizenship
Personal Development
Physical Education
Religious Education

See also
Key Stage
Key Stage 1
Key Stage 2
Key Stage 3
Key Stage 5
GCSE 
National Vocational Qualification

References

External links
Official National Curriculum website
Department for Education and Skills Performance Tables

School terminology
Educational stages
Secondary education in England
Secondary education in Wales
Secondary education in Northern Ireland